Jeffrey Swann (born November 24, 1951) is an American classical pianist.

Swann was born in Arizona but moved to Dallas, Texas, as a young child.  He began piano studies at the age of four. While attending St. Mark's School of Texas, he studied for seven years with Alexander Uninsky at Southern Methodist University in Dallas. (He was known at St. Mark's for practicing without shoes - socks only.) He received his Bachelor and Master of Music degrees from the Juilliard School under Beveridge Webster and Joseph Bloch. He completed his Doctor of Musical Arts degree under Adele Marcus, graduating with highest honors. During this time, he won the Young Concert Artists International Auditions in 1974 and opened the 1975–76 YCA Series at Carnegie Hall with his New York debut.

He won first prize in the Dino Ciani Competition sponsored by La Scala in Milan, second prize at the Queen Elisabeth Music Competition in Brussels, and top honors in the Warsaw Chopin, Van Cliburn, Vianna da Motta and Montreal Competitions.

References

Musicians from Dallas
American classical pianists
Male classical pianists
American male pianists
1951 births
Living people
Prize-winners of the Queen Elisabeth Competition
St. Mark's School (Texas) alumni
Prize-winners of the Van Cliburn International Piano Competition
Juilliard School alumni
20th-century American pianists
Classical musicians from Texas
21st-century classical pianists
20th-century American male musicians
21st-century American male musicians
21st-century American pianists
Music & Arts artists